Joseph C. Windbiel Jr. (March 6, 1897 – June 25, 1971) was a professional football player who played in the early 1920s in the National Football League (then called the American Professional Football Association). He played for the AFPA's Evansville Crimson Giants during the 1921 season. He also reportedly played for the Detroit Heralds before the team joined the NFL in 1920. Before playing pro football, Windbiel played at the college level for the University of Dayton. At Dayton, Windbiel was a three-time letterman (1913, 1915, 1916) and the captain of the school's 1916 team.

Outside of playing, Windbiel was also a high school football coach.

References

Dayton Flyers History 

1897 births
1971 deaths
Players of American football from Illinois
Dayton Flyers football players
Evansville Crimson Giants players
Detroit Heralds players